Albert Museum may refer to:

 Albert Hall Museum in Jaipur, India
 Royal Albert Memorial Museum, the largest museum in Exeter
 Victoria and Albert Museum, the world's largest museum of decorative arts and design